Abrid Shine is an Indian film director, screenwriter and fashion photographer in the Malayalam film industry. He made his directorial debut in 2014 with the film 1983, which won the Kerala State Film Award for Best Debut Director.

Personal life
Abrid Shine has two children. His son, Bhagath Abrid acted as the son of Nivin Pauly in the film 1983 and as the son of Soubin Shahir in malayalam movie Meow.

Career
Abrid Shine started his career working as a fashion photographer for the popular Malayalam women's magazine Vanitha. 
He assisted Lal Jose in Puramkazhchakal in the 2009 ensemble film Kerala Cafe. He debuted as a director with the Malayalam film 1983 in the year 2014.

Filmography

Awards and nominations

References

Malayalam film directors
Malayali people
Living people
Malayalam screenwriters
Year of birth missing (living people)
Film directors from Kerala
People from Kottayam district